Holsnøy is an island in Alver Municipality in Vestland county, Norway. The  island lies to the north/west of the mainland, between the islands of Radøy to the north and Askøy to the south. The island is hilly and marshy, with the majority of the residents living along the southern shore. The largest settlement on the island is the village of Frekhaug on the southern shore.

The island was the largest island in the old Meland municipality, and it made up 98% of the land area of the municipality.

The island is connected to the mainland road network by a series of bridges.  The Krossnessundet Bridge connects the southern tip of the island to the small island of Flatøy, just to the east. The island of Flatøy is connected to Knarvik to the east on the mainland Lindås peninsula by the Hagelsund Bridge and Flatøy is also connected to Bergen to the south on the Åsane peninsula by the Nordhordland Bridge.

Frekhaug Manor
Frekhaug Manor (Frekhaug hovedgård) is a manor house located on the southeast side of Holsnøy. The main house is a notched, two-story log house of painted white panel with a hipped roof. The building has a portal in rococo. The building was probably built in the 1780s and is surrounded by granite walls. In 1780, the farm was bought by skipper Cort Abrahamsen Holtermann (1730–1813). Since 1914 the farm and manor house have been owned by the Nordhordland home mission (Nordhordland indremisjon).

See also
List of islands of Norway

References

Islands of Vestland
Alver (municipality)